Oracle VM VirtualBox (formerly Sun VirtualBox, Sun xVM VirtualBox and InnoTek VirtualBox) is a type-2 hypervisor for x86 virtualization developed by Oracle Corporation. VirtualBox was originally created by InnoTek Systemberatung GmbH, which was acquired by Sun Microsystems in 2008, which was in turn acquired by Oracle in 2010.

VirtualBox may be installed on Microsoft Windows, macOS, Linux, Solaris and OpenSolaris. There are also ports to FreeBSD and Genode. It supports the creation and management of guest virtual machines running Windows, Linux, BSD, OS/2, Solaris, Haiku, and OSx86, as well as limited virtualization of  guests on Apple hardware. For some guest operating systems, a "Guest Additions" package of device drivers and system applications is available, which typically improves performance, especially that of graphics, and allows changing the resolution of the guest OS automatically when the window of the virtual machine on the host OS is resized.

Released under the terms of the GNU General Public License and, optionally, the CDDL for most files of the source distribution, VirtualBox is free and open-source software, though the Extension Pack is proprietary software. The License to VirtualBox was relicensed to GPLv3 with linking exceptions to the CDDL and other GPL-incompatible licenses.

History 

VirtualBox was first offered by InnoTek Systemberatung GmbH, a Germany company based in Weinstadt, under a proprietary software license, making one version of the product available at no cost for personal or evaluation use, subject to the VirtualBox Personal Use and Evaluation License (PUEL). In January 2007, based on counsel by LiSoG, InnoTek released VirtualBox Open Source Edition (OSE) as free and open-source software, subject to the requirements of the GNU General Public License (GPL), version 2.

InnoTek also contributed to the development of OS/2 and Linux support in virtualization and OS/2 ports of products from Connectix which were later acquired by Microsoft. Specifically, InnoTek developed the "additions" code in both Windows Virtual PC and Microsoft Virtual Server, which enables various host–guest OS interactions like shared clipboards or dynamic viewport resizing.

Sun Microsystems acquired InnoTek in February 2008.

Following the acquisition of Sun Microsystems by Oracle Corporation in January 2010, the product was re-branded as "Oracle VM VirtualBox".

In December 2019, VirtualBox started supporting only hardware-assisted virtualization, dropping support for Software-based one.

Release history 

 Version 3.2
 Mac OS X Server guest support – experimental
 Memory ballooning (not available on Solaris hosts)
 RAM deduplication (Page Fusion) for Windows guests on 64-bit hosts
 CPU hot-plugging for Linux (hot-add and hot-remove) and certain Windows guests (hot-add only)
 Deleting snapshots while the VM is running
 Multi-monitor guest setups in the GUI, for Windows guests
 LSI Logic SAS controller emulation
 Remote Desktop Protocol (RDP) video acceleration via a non-free extension
 Run and control guest applications from the host – for automated software deployments

 Version 4.0
 The PUEL/OSE separation was abandoned in favor of an open source base product and a closed source extension pack that can be installed on top of the base product. As part of this change, additional components of VirtualBox were made open source (installers, documentation, device drivers)
 Intel HD audio codec emulation
 Intel ICH9 chipset emulation
 A new VM storage scheme where all VM data is stored in one single folder to improve VM portability
 Several UI enhancements including a new look with VM preview and scale mode
 On 32-bit hosts, VMs can each use more than 1.5 GB of RAM
 In addition to OVF, the single file OVA format is supported
 CPU use and I/O bandwidth can be limited per VM
 Support for Apple DMG images (DVD)
 Multi-monitor guest setups for Linux/Solaris guests (previously Windows only)
 Resizing of disk image formats from Oracle, VDI (VirtualBox disk image), and Microsoft, VHD (Virtual PC hard disk)

 Version 4.1
 Windows Aero support (experimental)
 Virtual machine cloning

 Version 4.2
 Virtual machine groups – allows management of a group of virtual machines as a single unit (power them on or off, take snapshots, etc.)
 Some VM settings can be altered during VM execution
 Support up to 36 NICs in case of the ICH9 chipset
 Support for limiting network I/O bandwidth
 Can automatically run VMs on host system startup (except on Windows hosts)

 Version 4.3
 VM video-capture support
 Host touch device support (GUI passes host touch events to guest)/USB virtualization of such devices

 Version 5.0
 Paravirtualization support for Windows and Linux guests to improve time-keeping accuracy and performance
 USB3 controller based on Intel's hardware implementation. It is supported by any Windows version starting from Windows 8, any Linux kernel starting from 2.6.31 and Mac OS X starting from version 10.7.4.
 Bidirectional drag and drop support for Windows, Linux and Solaris guests
 VM disk image encryption via a non-free extension
 VM output scaling and HiDPI displays support
 Hotplugging of SATA disks using GUI
 USB traffic capturing
 VMs can be disconnected from a GUI session and run in background
 AVX, AVX-2, AES-NI, SSE 4.1/4.2 instructions (if supported by the host CPU)

 Version 6.0
 Support for exporting virtual machines to Oracle Cloud
 A file manager which allows to control the guest file system and copy files from/to it
 VMSVGA GPU driver for Linux hosts
 Surround speakers setup support
 Support for hardware-assisted nested virtualization on AMD CPUs

 Version 6.1
 Support for importing virtual machines from Oracle Cloud
 Added nested virtualization support for Intel CPUs (it was already available for AMD CPUs) starting with Intel Core i5 Broadwell
 Experimental support for file transfers via drag-n-drop only for Windows host and guests (disabled by default, must be enabled using VBoxManage)
 Support for virtio-scsi for hard disks and optical drives, including boot support
 Support for hosts with up to 1024 CPUs
 DXVA (hardware accelerated video decoding) support for Windows guests
 NVRAM support for EFI which improves compatibility with many guest OSes
 Software keyboard (virtual) for entering any keys to a guest
 Guest CPU use monitoring
 Dropped support for software CPU virtualization: a CPU with hardware virtualization support is now required
 Dropped support for PCI passthrough for Linux hosts

 Version 7.0
 Support for Windows 11 guest: UEFI Secure Boot and emulation of TPM 1.2 and 2.0 chips
 Intel and AMD IOMMU emulation
 Full VM encryption (in previous VirtualBox releases only VM disks could be encrypted) available via CLI
 3D acceleration with DirectX 11 on Windows, and DXVK on other hosts
 Dark mode for UI currently implemented only for Windows hosts
 Experimental support for Apple ARM64 hosts

Licensing 

The core package is, since version 4 in December 2010, free software under GNU General Public License version 2 (GPLv2). The separate "VirtualBox Oracle VM VirtualBox extension pack" providing support for USB 2.0 and 3.0 devices, Remote Desktop Protocol (RDP), disk encryption, NVMe and Preboot Execution Environment (PXE) boot is under a proprietary license, called Personal Use and Evaluation License (PUEL), which permits use of the software for personal use, educational use, or evaluation, free of charge. Since VirtualBox version 5.1.30 Oracle defines personal use as the installation of the software on a single host computer for non-commercial purposes. Unlike some software using a proprietary license, the "VirtualBox Oracle VM VirtualBox extension pack" is not source-available since it includes closed-source components, which does not make the source code publicly available.

Prior to version 4, there were two different packages of the VirtualBox software. The full package was offered gratis under the PUEL, with licenses for other commercial deployment purchasable from Oracle. A second package called the VirtualBox Open Source Edition (OSE) was released under GPLv2. This removed the same proprietary components not available under GPLv2.

Building the BIOS for VirtualBox  requires the use of the Open Watcom compiler, for which the Sybase Open Watcom Public License is approved as "Open Source" by the Open Source Initiative but not as "free" by the Free Software Foundation or under the Debian Free Software Guidelines.

Although VirtualBox has experimental support for macOS guests, the end user license agreement of macOS does not permit the operating system to run on non-Apple hardware, and this is enforced within the operating system by calls to the Apple System Management Controller (SMC) in all Apple machines, which verifies the authenticity of the hardware.

Virtualization 

Users of VirtualBox can load multiple guest OSes under a single host operating-system (host OS). Each guest can be started, paused and stopped independently within its own virtual machine (VM). The user can independently configure each VM and run it under a choice of software-based virtualization or hardware assisted virtualization if the underlying host hardware supports this. The host OS and guest OSs and applications can communicate with each other through a number of mechanisms including a common clipboard and a virtualized network facility. Guest VMs can also directly communicate with each other if configured to do so.

Hardware-assisted 

VirtualBox supports both Intel's VT-x and AMD's AMD-V hardware-assisted virtualization. Making use of these facilities, VirtualBox can run each guest VM in its own separate address-space; the guest OS ring 0 code runs on the host at ring 0 in VMX non-root mode rather than in ring 1. 

Starting with version 6.1, VirtualBox only supports this method. Until then, VirtualBox specifically supported some guests (including 64-bit guests, SMP guests and certain proprietary OSs) only on hosts with hardware-assisted virtualization.

Devices and peripherals 

VirtualBox emulates hard disks in three formats: the native VDI (Virtual Disk Image), the VMDK of VMware and the VHD of Microsoft Windows. It thus supports disks created by other hypervisor software. VirtualBox can also connect to iSCSI targets and to raw partitions on the host, using either as virtual hard disks. VirtualBox emulates IDE (PIIX4 and ICH6 controllers), SCSI, SATA (ICH8M controller) and SAS controllers to which hard drives can be attached.

VirtualBox has supported Open Virtualization Format (OVF) since version 2.2.0 (April 2009).

Both ISO images and physical devices connected to the host can be mounted as CD or DVD drives. VirtualBox supports running operating systems from live CDs and DVDs.

By default, VirtualBox provides graphics support through a custom virtual graphics-card that is VBE or UEFI GOP compatible. The Guest Additions for Windows, Linux, Solaris, OpenSolaris, or OS/2 guests include a special video-driver that increases video performance and includes additional features, such as automatically adjusting the guest resolution when resizing the VM window
or desktop composition via virtualized WDDM drivers .

For an Ethernet network adapter, VirtualBox virtualizes these Network Interface Cards:
 AMD PCnet PCI II (Am79C970A)
 AMD PCnet-Fast III (Am79C973)
 Intel Pro/1000 MT Desktop (82540EM)
 Intel Pro/1000 MT Server (82545EM)
 Intel Pro/1000 T Server (82543GC)
 Paravirtualized network adapter (virtio-net)

The emulated network cards allow most guest OSs to run without the need to find and install drivers for networking hardware as they are shipped as part of the guest OS. A special paravirtualized network adapter is also available, which improves network performance by eliminating the need to match a specific hardware interface, but requires special driver support in the guest. (Many distributions of Linux ship with this driver included.) By default, VirtualBox uses NAT through which Internet software for end-users such as Firefox or ssh can operate. Bridged networking via a host network adapter or virtual networks between guests can also be configured. Up to 36 network adapters can be attached simultaneously, but only four are configurable through the graphical interface.

For a sound card, VirtualBox virtualizes Intel HD Audio, Intel ICH AC'97 and SoundBlaster 16 devices.

A USB 1.1 controller is emulated so that any USB devices attached to the host can be seen in the guest. The proprietary extension pack adds a USB 2.0 or USB 3.0 controllers and, if VirtualBox acts as an RDP server, it can also use USB devices on the remote RDP client as if they were connected to the host, although only if the client supports this VirtualBox-specific extension (Oracle provides clients for Solaris, Linux and Sun Ray thin clients that can do this, and have promised support for other platforms in future versions).

Software-based 

In the absence of hardware-assisted virtualization, versions 6.0 and earlier of VirtualBox could adopt a standard software-based virtualization approach. This mode supports 32-bit guest OSs which run in rings 0 and 3 of the Intel ring architecture.

 The system reconfigures the guest OS code, which would normally run in ring 0, to execute in ring 1 on the host hardware. Because this code contains many privileged instructions which cannot run natively in ring 1, VirtualBox employs a Code Scanning and Analysis Manager (CSAM) to scan the ring 0 code recursively before its first execution to identify problematic instructions and then calls the Patch Manager (PATM) to perform in-situ patching. This replaces the instruction with a jump to a VM-safe equivalent compiled code fragment in hypervisor memory.
 The guest user-mode code, running in ring 3, generally runs directly on the host hardware in ring 3.

In both cases, VirtualBox uses CSAM and PATM to inspect and patch the offending instructions whenever a fault occurs. VirtualBox also contains a dynamic recompiler, based on QEMU to recompile any real mode or protected mode code entirely (e.g. BIOS code, a DOS guest, or any operating system startup).

Using these techniques, VirtualBox can achieve a performance comparable to that of VMware.

The feature was dropped starting with VirtualBox 6.1.

Features 

 Snapshots of the RAM and storage that allow reverting to a prior state.
 Screenshots and screen video capture
 "Host key" for releasing the keyboard and mouse cursor to the host system if captured (coupled) to the guest system, and for keyboard shortcuts to features such as configuration, restarting, and screenshot. By default, it is the right-side CTRL key.
 Mouse pointer integration, meaning automatic coupling and uncoupling of mouse cursor when moved inside and outside the virtual screen, if supported by guest operating system.
 Seamless mode – the ability to run virtualized applications side by side with normal desktop applications
 Shared clipboard
 Shared folders through "guest additions" software
 Special drivers and utilities to facilitate switching between systems
 Ability to specify amount of shared RAM, video memory, and CPU execution cap
 Ability to emulate multiple screens
 Command line interaction (in addition to the GUI)
 Public API (Java, Python, SOAP, XPCOM) to control VM configuration and execution
 Nested paging for AMD-V and Intel VT (only for processors supporting SLAT and with SLAT enabled)
 Limited support for 3D graphics acceleration (including OpenGL up to (but not including) 3.0 and Direct3D 9.0c via Wine's Direct3D to OpenGL translation in versions prior to 7.0 or DXVK in later releases)
 SMP support (up to 32 virtual CPUs per virtual machine), since version 3.0
 Teleportation (aka Live Migration)
 2D video output acceleration (not to be mistaken with video decoding acceleration), since version 3.1
 EFI has been supported since version 3.1 (Windows 7 guests are not supported)

Storage emulation 

 Ability to mount virtual hard disk drives and disk images. Virtual optical disc images can be used for booting and sharing files to guest systems lacking networking support.
 NCQ support for SATA, SCSI and SAS raw disks and partitions
 SATA disk hotplugging
 Pass-through mode for solid-state drives
 Pass-through mode for CD/DVD/BD drives – allows users to play audio CDs, burn optical disks, and play encrypted DVD discs
 Can disable host OS I/O cache
 Allows limitation of IO bandwidth
 PATA, SATA, SCSI, SAS, iSCSI, floppy disk controllers
 VM disk image encryption using AES128/AES256

Storage support includes:

 Raw hard disk access – allows physical hard disk partitions on the host system to appear in the guest system
 VMware Virtual Machine Disk (VMDK) format support – allows exchange of disk images with VMware
 Microsoft VHD support
 QEMU qed and qcow disks
 HDD format disks (only version 2; versions 3 and 4 are not supported) used by Parallels virtualization products

Limitations 
 3D graphics acceleration for Windows guests earlier than Windows 7  was removed in version 6.1. This affected Windows XP  and Windows Vista.
 VirtualBox has a very low transfer rate to and from USB2 devices.
 Despite being an open source product, some of its features are available only in a binary form under a commercial license (see "VirtualBox Extension Pack" below).
 USB3 devices pass through is not supported by older guest OSes like Windows Vista and Windows XP due to the lack of drivers however starting with version 5.0 VirtualBox offers experimental Renesas uPD720201 xHCI USB3 controller which allows to use USB3 in these operating systems through manual modification of configuration files.
 Guest Additions for macOS are unavailable at this time.
 Guest Additions for Windows 9x (Windows 95, 98 and ME) are not available. This results in poor performance due to the lack of graphics acceleration with the default limited color depth (external third-party software is available to enable support for 32-bit color mode, resulting in better performance).
 EFI support is incomplete, e.g. EFI boot for a Windows 7 guest is not supported.
 Only older versions of DirectX and OpenGL passthrough are supported (the feature can be enabled using the 3D Acceleration option for each VM individually).
 Video RAM is limited to 128 MiB (256 MiB with 2D Video Acceleration enabled) due to technical difficulties (merely changing the GUI to allow the user to allocate more video RAM to a VM or manually editing the configuration file of a VM won't work and will result in a fatal error).
 Windows 95/98/98SE/ME cannot be installed or work unreliably with modern CPUs (AMD Zen and newer; Intel Tiger Lake and newer) and hardware assisted virtualization (VirtualBox 6.1 and higher). This is due to these OSes not being coded correctly. An open source patch has been developed to fix the issue which also addresses Windows 95/98/98SE bug which makes the system crash when running on new fast CPUs.
VirtualBox 7.0  and later is required to run a pristine Windows 11 guest.

Host support 

The supported operating systems include:
 Windows 8.1 and higher. Support for 64-bit Windows was added with VirtualBox 1.5. Support for Windows XP was removed with VirtualBox 5.0. Support for Windows Vista was removed with VirtualBox 5.2. Windows 7 support was removed in version 6.1.
 Windows Server 2012 and higher
 Linux distributions
 macOS from version 10.13 High Sierra to 10.15 Catalina (only on Intel-based Macs):
 Preliminary Mac OS X support (beta stage) was added with VirtualBox 1.4, full support with 1.6.
 Mac OS X 10.4 (Tiger) support was removed with VirtualBox 3.1.
 Support for Mac OS X 10.7 (Lion) and earlier was removed with VirtualBox 5.0.
 Support for Mac OS X 10.8 (Mountain Lion) was removed with VirtualBox 5.1.
 Support for Mac OS X 10.9 (Mavericks) was removed with VirtualBox 5.2. 
 Support for (Mac) OS X 10.10 Yosemite and OS X 10.11 El Capitan was removed with VirtualBox 6.0.
 Support for macOS 10.12 Sierra was officially removed with VirtualBox 6.1 (as of 6.1.16 it will still install and run, however)
 No support of macOS 11 Big Sur and later versions is officially provided. Users reported various technical issues when running VirtualBox on macOS Big Sur.
 Experimental support for Apple silicon-based Macs was added in version 7.0 beta.
 Oracle Solaris

Guests 

Some features require the installation of the closed-source "VirtualBox Extension Pack":
 Support for a virtual USB 2.0/3.0 controller (EHCI/xHCI)
 VirtualBox RDP: support for the proprietary remote connection protocol developed by Microsoft and Citrix Systems.
 PXE boot for Intel cards.
 VM disk image encryption
 Camera / webcam support

While VirtualBox itself is free to use and is distributed under an open source license the VirtualBox Extension Pack is licensed under the VirtualBox Personal Use and Evaluation License (PUEL). Personal use is free but commercial users need to purchase a license. Oracle routinely checks log files for downloads of the VirtualBox Extension Pack from nonresidential IP addresses and contacts unlicensed users to enforce compliance.

While Guest Additions are installed within each suitable guest virtual machine, the Extension Pack is installed on the host running VirtualBox.

Derivatives 

A commercial port of VirtualBox OSE with built-in support for Direct X 12.1 / Vulkan 3D API inside virtual machines has been released by the main contributor of the FreeRDP project, called Thincast Workstation.

See also 

 Comparison of platform virtualization software
 VMware Workstation
 OS-level virtualization
 x86 virtualization

References

External links 

 
 Oracle
 Oracle Cloud

Articles containing video clips
Cross-platform free software
Free emulation software
Free software programmed in C++
Free virtualization software
Platform virtualization software
Software derived from or incorporating Wine
Software that uses Qt
Sun Microsystems software
Virtualization software for Linux
Cloud infrastructure
Oracle Cloud Services